Azab (also Romanized as ‘Az̄āb) is a village in Qarah Su Rural District, in the Central District of Khoy County, West Azerbaijan Province, Iran. At the 2006 census, its population was 1,237, in 252 families.

References 

Populated places in Khoy County